Simona Halep was the defending champion, but lost to Ana Ivanovic in the second round.

Sara Errani won the title, defeating Barbora Strýcová in the final, 6–0, 6–2.

This was the first time at either a WTA or ATP event that all seeded players lost their first match.

Seeds
The top four seeds received a bye into the second round.

Draw

Finals

Top half

Bottom half

Qualifying

Seeds

Qualifiers

Qualifying draw

First qualifier

Second qualifier

Third qualifier

Fourth qualifier

References

External links
 Main Draw
 Qualifying Draw

Dubai Tennis Championships - Singles
2016 Dubai Tennis Championships